Michael Weiss may refer to:

Sports
 Michael Weiss (figure skater) (born 1976), American former figure skater
 Michael Weiss (swimmer) (born 1991), American swimmer
 Michael Weiss (triathlete) (born 1981), Austrian triathlete and cyclist
 Michael Weiß (football manager) (born 1965), German association football coach

Other
 Michael Weiss (engineer), American engineer in NASA in-orbit satellite program
 Michael Weiss (journalist), American journalist and author
 Michael Weiss (mathematician) (born 1955), German mathematician
 Michael Weiss (pianist) (born 1958), jazz pianist and composer
 Michael David Weiss (1967–1999), American lawyer who fought to provide nurses with safer syringes, as told in the 2011 feature film Puncture
 Michael T. Weiss (born 1962), American actor
 Michael Weiß (politician) (1569–1612), Transylvanian Saxon politician and historian